The In Our Bones Tour is the third headlining concert tour by American pop rock band Against the Current. Launched in support of their first studio album, In Our Bones (2016), the tour began on September 6, 2016 in Seoul, South Korea and concluded on October 18, 2017 in Buenos Aires, Argentina.

Shows

References

2016 concert tours